Malankara Action Council for Church Act Association (MACCABI) is a public movement started for the implementation of Church Act 2009 submitted before the government of Kerala by the Kerala Law Reforms Commission headed by late Justice V.R Krishna Iyer in 2009. MACCABI is an independent non-profit organization registered under the Travancore-Cochin registration act.

Public Movements

27 November 2019 
Lakhs of Christians march to the Secretariat demanding the State government to implement the Kerala Church Properties and Institutions Trust Bill, proposed by Late Justice V.R. Krishna Iyer in 2009.

12 October 2019 
Bar Yuhanon Ramban, Director of MACCABI, inaugurated the event organized by Members of ‘Justice for Sr Lucy’, held at Vanchi Square in Ernakulam in support of Lucy Kalappura, who was expelled from the Franciscan Clarist Congregation (FCC) for her lifestyle violations.

22 May 2018 
A secretariat March was jointly organised by All Kerala Church Act Action Council and MACCABI asking the government to pass the bill in the assembly. March started from Palayam Marty’s Square and staged a dharna in front of the Secretariat.

Critics 
There was a hearsay spread by powerful bishops against the public movement that the government would interfere into the religious matters and local politician control our church. But the Section 2 on the church bill clearly mention that the act doesn’t propose to get involved in or to formulate opinions or to make decisions on any matters connected with the teachings and practices of the various churches about faith and theology. Also, section 16 – i, ii, iii clearly mention that the government duty is to check the accounts and to minimize corruption at all levels of church.

References 

Indian Oriental Orthodox Christians
Christianity in Kerala